

Born in Strasbourg

Before 1750 
 Eric of Friuli (8th century), Frankish duke of Friuli
 Hugh Ripelin of Strasburg (ca. 1205–ca. 1270), theologian
 Johannes Tauler (1300–1361), mystic and theologian
 Fritsche Closener (died before 1373), priest, historian
 Rulman Merswin (ca. 1307–1382), mystic
 Jakob Twinger von Königshofen (1346–1420), chronicler
 Martin Schott (d. 1499), printer
 Johannes Schott (1477–1550), printer
 Hieronymus Brunschwig (ca. 1450–ca. 1512), surgeon, alchemist and botanist
 Sebastian Brant (1457–1521), satirical poet and humanist
 Ottmar Luscinius (1478–1537), theologian and humanist
 Hans Kotter (1480–1541), composer and organist
 Wilhelm Stetter (1487–1552), painter and priest
 Jacob Sturm von Sturmeck (1489–1553), Protestant statesman and reformist
 Andreas Cratander (1490–1540), printer
 Katharina Zell (1497–1568), Protestant writer
 Jacob Micyllus (1503–1558), humanist and teacher
 Martin Schalling the Younger (1532–1608), Protestant theologian and writer
 Daniel Specklin (1536–1589), architect, engineer and cartographer
 Johann Fischart (1545–1591), satirical author
 Johannes Piscator (1546–1625), theologian and translator
 Johann Theodor de Bry (1561–1623), engraver and publisher
 Sebastian Stoskopff (1597–1657), painter
 Johann Wilhelm Baur (1607–1640), engraver, etcher and miniature painter
 Albrecht Kauw (1621–1681), painter
 Marie Luise von Degenfeld (1634–1677), morganatic second wife of Charles I Louis, Elector Palatine
 Countess Palatine Anna Magdalena of Birkenfeld-Bischweiler (1640–1693)
 Christian III, Count Palatine of Zweibrücken (1674–1735)
 Friedrich Ludwig, Prince of Hohenzollern-Hechingen (1688–1750)
 Countess Palatine Caroline of Zweibrücken (1721–1774)
 Dagobert Sigmund von Wurmser (1724–1797), Austrian field marshal
 Johann Georg Roederer (1726–1763), physician and obstetrician
 Richard François Philippe Brunck (1729–1803), French classical scholar
 Jean-Joseph Rodolphe (1730–1812), horn player, violinist and composer
 Jérémie-Jacques Oberlin (1735–1806), philologist and archaeologist
 François Christophe Kellermann (1735–1820), French marshall
 Christoph Wilhelm von Koch (1737–1813), diplomat, politician, librarian and writer
 Philippe Rühl (1737–1795), politician
 Ludwig Heinrich von Nicolay (1737–1820), poet and President of the St. Petersburg Academy of Sciences
 Philip James de Loutherbourg (1740–1812), painter
 Jean-Frédéric Oberlin (1740–1826), pastor and philanthropist
 Johann Christian von Mannlich (1741–1822), painter and architect
 Heinrich Leopold Wagner (1747–1779), writer
 Philippe Friedrich Dietrich (1748–1793), scholar and politician 
 Jean-Frédéric Edelmann (1749–1794), composer
 Johan Peter Rottler (1749–1836), missionary and botanist
 Johann von Türckheim (1749–1824), diplomat

Between 1750 and 1900 
 Sébastien Érard (1752–1837), instrument maker
 Philippe-André Grandidier (1752–1787), priest and historian
 Bernard-Frédéric de Turckheim (1752–1831), politician
 Jean Baptiste Kléber (1753–1800), architect and general
 Jean-François Barbier (1754–1828), general
 Louis Ramond de Carbonnières (1755–1827), politician, geologist and botanist
 Antoinette Saint-Huberty (1756–1812), opera singer
 Christophe Guérin (1758–1831), engraver and painter
 François Andrieux (1759–1833), playwright and poet
 Jacques Widerkehr (1759–1823), cellist and composer
 Joseph Ludwig Colmar (1760–1818), bishop of Mainz
 Christian Kramp (1760–1826), mathematician
 Marie Tussaud (1761–1850), founder of Madame Tussauds
 Johann Jakob Humann (1771–1834) Roman Catholic clergyman
 Charles-Joseph Christiani (1772–1840), Maréchal de camp of the French Army
 Louis-François Lejeune (1775–1848), general, painter, and lithographer
 Jean-Baptiste Schwilgué (1776–1856), clockmaker
 Chrétien Géofroy Nestler (1778–1832), botanist and pharmacist
 Johann Georg Daniel Arnold (1780–1829), lawyer and writer
 Samson Cerfberr (1780–1826), soldier and author
 Jean-Georges Humann (1780–1842), statesman
 Jean-Frédéric de Turckheim (1780–1850), politician
 Gustave Vogt (1781–1870), oboist and composer
 Nicholas-Henri Schreider (1783–1832), champagne maker
 Maximilien Joseph Schauenburg (1784–1838), military officer
 Ludwig I of Bavaria (1786–1868)
 Camille Pleyel (1788–1855), piano manufacturer and musical entrepreneur
 Princess Augusta of Bavaria (1788–1851)
 Édouard Spach (1801–1879), botanist
 Baruch Schleisinger Weil (1802–1893), American businessman and politician
 August Stöber (1808–1884), poet, scholar and collector of folklore
 Louis Roederer (1809–1870), champagne maker
 Jean-Georges Kastner (1810–1867), composer and musicologist
 Adolphe Stoeber (1810–1892), ecclesiastic and writer
 Marie-Alphonse Ratisbonne (1814–1884), Catholic priest and missionary
 Louis Charles Auguste Steinheil (1814–1885), painter
 Émile Küss (1815–1871), physician and politician
 Charles Adolphe Wurtz (1818–1884), chemist
 Charles Frédéric Gerhardt (1818–1856), chemist
 Benjamin-Constant Martha (1820–1895), historian
 August Kayser (1821–1885), Protestant theologian
 Théophile Schuler (1821–1878), painter and illustrator
 Hippolyte Pradelles (1824–1913), painter
 Oscar Berger-Levrault (1826–1903), philatelist
 Charles Netter (1826–1882), French Zionist
 Louis Ratisbonne (1827–1900), writer
 Paul Schützenberger (1829–1897), chemist
 Frédéric Albert Constantin Weber (1830–1903), botanist
 Gustave Doré (1832–1883), painter
 Charles Friedel (1832–1899), chemist and mineralogist
 Frédéric Auguste Lichtenberger (1832–1899), theologian
 Mélanie de Pourtalès (1836–1914), socialite
 Émile Waldteufel (1837–1915), composer
 Édouard Schuré (1841–1929), philosopher
 Edward Dannreuther (1844–1905), pianist and musicologist
 Nicolas Delsor (1847–1927), priest and politician
 Alfred Morel-Fatio (1850–1924), hispanist
 Jules Martha (1853–1932), archaeologist
 Paul Émile Appell (1855–1930), mathematician
 Andreas Franz Wilhelm Schimper (1856–1901), botanist and phytogeographer
 Léon Wieger (1856–1933), Jesuit missionary, medical doctor, theologist and sinologist 
 Charles de Foucauld (1858–1916), Christian mystic
 Charles Diehl (1859–1944), historian
 Hugo Becker (1863–1941), cellist, cello teacher, and composer
 Charles Andler (1866–1933), germanist and philosopher
 Eugène Wilhelm (1866–1951), lawyer, judge and writer
 Ernest Henri Demanne (1870–1938), comedian
 André Lichtenberger (1870–1940), novelist and sociologist
 Helmar Lerski (1871–1956), photographer
 Heinrich Emil Timerding (1873–1945), mathematician
 Heinrich Liebmann (1874–1939), mathematician and geometer
 Max Looff (1874–1954), naval officer
 Karl Wendling (1875–1962), violinist and musical educator
 Léo Schnug (1878–1933), painter and illustrator
 Karl Klingler (1879–1971), violinist and composer
 Émile Mathis (1880–1956), car manufacturer
 Richard Laqueur (1881–1959), historian and philologist
 Elisabeth Abegg (1882–1974), educator and Nazi resistance fighter
 Ernst Damzog (1882–1945), Brigadeführer of the SS
 Robert Redslob (1882–1962), constitutional and public international law-scientist
 Georges Weill (1882–1970), German politician who defected to France
 Paul Gröber (1885–1964), geologist
 Jean/Hans Arp (1886–1966), artist
 René Beeh (1886–1822), painter and draughtsman
 Robert Heger (1886–1978), conductor
 Hilla von Rebay (1890–1967), artist, museum director
 Jules Kruger (1891–1959), cinematographer
 Charles Münch (1891–1968), conductor
 Friedrich-Georg Eberhardt (1892–1964), general
 Friedrich-Wilhelm Krüger (1894–1945), Nazi official and high-ranking member of the SA and the SS
 Marcelle Cahn (1895–1981), artist
 Hans-Georg von Friedeburg (1895–1945), admiral of the Kriegsmarine
 Paul Alverdes (1897–1979), novelist and poet
 Rudolf Schwarz (1897–1961), architect

After 1900 
 Hans Heinz Stuckenschmidt (1901–1988), musicologist
 Hans Bethe (1906–2005), physicist, Nobel Prize winner
 Gerolf Steiner (1908–2009), zoologist
 Hans-Otto Meissner (1909–1992), writer
 Max Bense (1910–1990), philosopher
 Georges Loinger (1910–2018), member of the French Resistance
 Jean-Paul de Dadelsen (1913–1957), poet and journalist
 Antoinette Becker (1920–1998), writer and translator
 Jacques Martin (1921–2010), comic-book artist
 Germain Muller (1923–1994), playwright, songwriter, poet, actor, humourist, politician
 Marcel Marceau (1923–2007), mime
 Serge Leclaire (1924–1994), psychiatrist and psychoanalyst
 Pierre Weil (1924–2008), psychologist and educator
 Noah Klieger (1926–2018), journalist
 Francis Rapp (1926–2020), historian
 Claude Rich (1929–2017), actor
 Tomi Ungerer (1931–2019), writer, illustrator and caricaturist
 Solange Fernex (1934–2006), politician
 Liliane Ackermann (1938–2007), French Jewish community leader
 Gilbert Gress (born 1941), football coach
 Jean-Pierre Hubert (1941–2006), author
 Isoldé Elchlepp (born 1942) German protest song singer, and operatic mezzo-soprano and soprano
 Wolfgang Huber (born 1942), theologian and ethicist
 Bob Wollek (1943–2001), rally driver
 Herbert Léonard (born 1945), singer
 Joseph Daul (born 1947), politician
 Thierry Mugler (1948–2022), fashion designer
 Francis Wurtz (born 1948), politician
 Michel Warschawski (born 1949), Israeli anti-Zionist writer and activist
 Arsène Wenger OBE (born 1949), football manager
 Jean-Marie Bockel (born 1950), politician
 Catherine Trautmann (born 1951), politician
 Patrice Meyer (born 1957), guitarist
 Elizabeth Sombart (born 1958), pianist
 Alain Weill (born 1961), business executive
 Patrick Cahuzac (born 1963), writer, winner of the Prix Fénéon for literature in 1990
 Emmanuel Villaume (born 1964), conductor
 Carole Richert (born 1967), actress
 Christophe Ohrel (born 1968), football player
 Philippe Schaaf (born 1968), handball player
 Eliette Abécassis (born 1969), writer
 Yann Wehrling (born 1971), artist and leader of the French Green Party
 Elif Şafak (born 1971), writer
 Alexis Kohler (born 1972), politician
 Valérien Ismaël (born 1975), football player
 Armando Teixeira (born 1976), football player
 Mehdi Baala (born 1978), athlete
 Nicolas Mougin (born 1979), professional vert skater
 Blandine Brocard (born 1981), politician
 Paul-Henri Mathieu (born 1982), tennis player
 Antoine Grauss (born 1984), football player
 Pio Marmaï (born 1984), actor
 Karim Matmour (born 1985), football player
 Laura Weissbecker (born 1984), actress
 M. Pokora (born 1985), singer
 Candice Didier (born 1988), figure skater
 Jonathan Schmid (born 1990), football player

Notable residents of Strasbourg 

 
 Meister Eckhart (1260–1328), philosopher
 Johannes Gutenberg (1400–1468), inventor of printing with movable type
 Johann Geiler von Kaisersberg (1445–1510), preacher
 Erasmus (1467–1536), humanist
 Hans Baldung (1484–1545), painter
 Beatus Rhenanus (1485–1547), humanist
 Caspar Schwenckfeld (1489–1561), theologian
 Martin Bucer (1491–1551), Reformation leader
 Johannes Sleidanus (1506–1556), German historian, the annalist of the Reformation
 Johannes Sturm (1507–1589), teacher and pedagogue
 John Calvin (1509–1564), Reformation leader
 Michael Servetus (1511–1553), Spanish theologian, physician and humanist
 Joachim Meyer (1537?–1571), fencer, author of an influential fechtbuch
 Tobias Stimmer (1539–1584), Swiss painter
 Johann Carolus (1575–1634), German publisher
 François-Marie, 1st duc de Broglie (1671–1745), marshall and governor of Strasbourg 
 Johann Daniel Schöpflin (1694–1771), historian and jurist, Goethe's teacher at Strasbourg University
 Franz Xaver Richter (1709–1789), composer, eminent member of the Mannheim school
 Johann Hermann (1738–1800), French physician and naturalist
 Johann Wolfgang von Goethe (1749–1832), poet, playwright, novelist, researcher
 Jakob Michael Reinhold Lenz (1751–1792), poet
 King Maximilian I Joseph of Bavaria (1756–1825), spent several years in Strasbourg
 Wolfgang Amadeus Mozart (1756–1791), composer, spent 23 days there in 1778
 Ignaz Pleyel (1757–1831), served as Kapellmeister at the Cathedral in 1789
 Maximilian von Montgelas (1759–1838), Bavarian statesman
 Claude Joseph Rouget de Lisle (1760–1836), composer of the Marseillaise
 Klemens von Metternich (1773–1859), studied in Strasbourg from 1788 to 1790
 Georg Büchner (1813–1837), writer
 Numa Denis Fustel de Coulanges (1830–1889), historian
 Louis Pasteur (1830–1895), scientist
 Viktor Nessler (1841–1890), composer
 Lujo Brentano (1844–1931), economist
 Karl Ferdinand Braun (1850–1918), physicist, Nobel Prize
 Albrecht Kossel (1853–1927), medical doctor, Nobel Prize
 Georg Simmel (1858–1918), sociologist
 Georges Friedel (1865–1933), mineralogist, son of Charles Friedel
 Hans Pfitzner (1869–1949), composer
 Fritz Beblo (1872–1947), architect
 Jean-Jacques Waltz aka Hansi (1873–1951), artist
 Albert Schweitzer (1875–1965), theologian, philosopher, physician and musician
 Paul Rohmer (1876–1977), physician, considered as one of the fathers of modern paediatrics
 Maurice Halbwachs (1877–1945), sociologist
 Otto Meißner (1880–1953), politician, father of Hans-Otto Meissner
 Otto Klemperer (1885–1973), conductor
 Marc Bloch (1886–1944), historian and resistant
 Hans Rosbaud (1895–1962), conductor
 George Szell (1897–1970), conductor
 Emmanuel Lévinas (1906–1995), philosopher
 Maurice Blanchot (1907–2003), writer and philosopher
 Pierre Pflimlin (1907–2000), politician
 Lucie Aubrac (born 1912) and Raymond Aubrac (born 1914), founding members of the Résistance
 Antoinette Feuerwerker (1912–2003), jurist, member of the Résistance
 Ernest Bour (1913–2001), conductor
 Paul Ricoeur (1913–2005), philosopher
 Salomon Gluck (1914–1944), physician, member of the Résistance
 Rose Warfman (born 1916), nurse, survivor of Auschwitz and member of the Résistance
 Hélène Boschi (1917–1990) pianist
 René Thom (1923–2002), mathematician 
 Guy Debord (1931–1994), philosopher
 Sarkis Zabunyan (born 1938), painter
 Alberto Fujimori (born 1938), Peruvian president
 Jean-Marie Lehn (born 1939), Nobel Prize for chemistry 1987
 Alain Lombard (born 1940), conductor
 Philippe Lacoue-Labarthe (1940–2007), philosopher
 Jean-Luc Nancy (born 1940), philosopher
 Jules Hoffmann (born 1941), Nobel Prize in Physiology or Medicine 2011
 Georges Aperghis (born 1945), composer
 Bernard-Marie Koltès (1948–1989), playwright
 Barbara Honigmann (born 1949), German writer and painter
 Pierre Moerlen (1952–2005), musician
 Ségolène Royal (born 1953), leading member of the Parti Socialiste, went to school in Strasbourg
 Thomas Ebbesen (born 1954), physical chemist
 John Howe (born 1957), artist
 Mireille Delunsch (born 1962), soprano
 Marjane Satrapi (born 1969), comic-strip artist

Strasbourg